As part of the wider 2014 United Kingdom local elections the Metropolitan Borough of Gateshead had 22 of its 66 seats up for election under the common one-thirds system. All of these councillors were elected for four year terms.

Election Breakdown by Ward

Birtley

Blaydon

Bridges

Chopwell and Rowlands Gill

Chowdene

Crawcrook and Greenside

Deckham

Dunston and Teams

Dunston Hill and Whickham East

Felling

High Fell

Lamesley

Lobley Hill and Bensham

Low Fell

Pelaw and Heworth

Ryton, Crookhill and Stella

Saltwell

Wardley and Leam Lane

Whickham North

Whickham South and Sunniside

Windy Nook and Whitehills

Winlaton and High Spen

References

 Statement of Nominations
 Results

2014 English local elections
2014
21st century in Tyne and Wear